A town is an incorporated municipality in the Canadian province of Prince Edward Island.

Prince Edward Island has ten towns, which had a cumulative population of 28,905 and an average population of 2,891 in the 2016 Census. The province's largest and smallest towns are Stratford and North Rustico with populations of 9,706 and 607 respectively. The province's newest town is Three Rivers, which was incorporated on September 28, 2018.

Governance 
Pursuant to Prince Edward Island's Municipal Government Act (MGA), each town elects a mayor and six councillors, unless an increase is enacted by municipal bylaw. For the 2018-2022 term, nine of the ten towns have a council of seven, while Three Rivers has a council of thirteen, which results in a total of 92 elected officials governing towns in Prince Edward Island. The last municipal election was November 5, 2018. The next is scheduled for November 7, 2022.

List

Former towns 

Former towns in Prince Edward Island include:
Borden, which was part of the amalgamation that created Borden-Carleton on April 12, 1995;
Georgetown, which was part of the amalgamation that formed the Town of Three Rivers on September 28, 2018;
Montague, which was also part of the amalgamation that formed the Town of Three Rivers on September 28, 2018; and
Parkdale, which amalgamated with the City of Charlottetown on April 1, 1995.

See also 
List of municipalities in Prince Edward Island

Notes

References

External links 
Federation of Prince Edward Island Municipalities
Municipalities – Government of Prince Edward Island: Department of Fisheries and Communities

Towns